Steinbrinck was a wolfpack of German U-boats that operated during the World War II Battle of the Atlantic from 3 August 1942 to 11 August 1942.

Name
He sank 204 ships for a total of

Service
The group was responsible for sinking eleven merchant ships  and damaging a further three merchant ships .

Raiding Summary

U-boats

Bibliography

References
Notes

Wolfpacks of 1942